Boana buriti is a species of frog in the family Hylidae endemic to Brazil.
Its natural habitats are moist savanna, subtropical or tropical moist shrubland, freshwater marshes, and intermittent freshwater marshes. It is threatened by habitat loss.

References

Sources

Boana
Endemic fauna of Brazil
Taxonomy articles created by Polbot
Amphibians described in 1999